EBLM J0555-57 is a triple star system approximately 670 light-years from Earth. EBLM J0555-57Ab, the smallest star in the system, orbits its primary star with a period of 7.8 days, and at the time of discovery, was the smallest known star with a mass sufficient to enable the fusion of hydrogen in its core.

System

EBLM J0555-57, also known as CD−57 1311, is a triple star system in the constellation Pictor, which contains a visual binary system consisting of two sun-like stars separated by 2.5": EBLM J0555-57Aa, a magnitude 9.98 spectral type F8 star, and EBLM J0555-57B, a magnitude 10.76 star. No orbital motion has been detected but they have almost identical radial velocities and are assumed to be gravitationally bound.

Component A of the system is itself an eclipsing binary (EBLM J0555-57Ab orbiting EBLM J0555-57Aa). Eclipses, also known as transits in the context of planetary searches, have been detected in the near infrared, with brightness drops of 0.05% during the eclipse. The shape and duration of the transits allow the radii of the two stars to be determined. A full solution of the orbit gives a period of 7 days and 18 hours, with a low eccentricity of 0.09, an almost edge-on inclination of 89.84°, and a semi-major axis of 0.08 AU.

EBLM J0555-57Ab
EBLM J0555-57Ab has a mass of about  Jupiter masses, or 0.081 solar masses. Its radius is 0.08 solar radii (about 60,000 km), comparable to Saturn, which has an equatorial radius of 60,268 km. The star is about 250 times more massive than Saturn. Current stellar models put its mass at the lower limit for hydrogen-burning stars. EBLM J0555-57Ab was discovered by a group of scientists at the University of Cambridge associated with the EBLM project (Eclipsing Binary, Low Mass), using data collected by the WASP project. WASP (Wide Angle Search for Planets) is searching for exoplanets using the transit method. Additional properties of the star were determined using Doppler spectroscopy, to measure the periodic radial velocity variation of the primary star due to the gravitational influence of its companion.  EBLM J0555-57Ab is the smallest star currently known.

See also
 2MASS J0523−1403
 OGLE-TR-122 - This binary stellar system contained one of the smallest red dwarfs known when it was discovered.
 OGLE-TR-123
 TRAPPIST-1
 SSSPM J0829-1309
 List of smallest stars

References

External links
Smallest ever star discovered by astronomers University of Cambridge

J05553262-5717261
Durchmusterung objects
Triple star systems
Eclipsing binaries
Pictor (constellation)
F-type main-sequence stars
TIC objects